Tandanus is a genus of eeltail catfishes endemic to Australia.

Species
There are currently 3 recognized species in this genus:
 Tandanus bostocki Whitley, 1944 (Freshwater cobbler)
 Tandanus tandanus Mitchell, 1838 (Tandan catfish)
 Tandanus tropicanus Welsh, Jerry & Burrows, 2014 (Wet Tropics Tandan)

References

 

Catfish genera
Freshwater fish genera
Taxa named by Thomas Mitchell (explorer)